

Events

Pre-1600
 557 – Constantinople is severely damaged by an earthquake, which cracks the dome of Hagia Sophia.
 835 – Sweet Dew Incident: Emperor Wenzong of the Tang dynasty conspires to kill the powerful eunuchs of the Tang court, but the plot is foiled.
1287 – St. Lucia's flood: The Zuiderzee sea wall in the Netherlands collapses, killing over 50,000 people.
1542 – Princess Mary Stuart becomes Queen of Scots at the age of one week on the death of her father, James V of Scotland.

1601–1900
1751 – The Theresian Military Academy is founded in Wiener Neustadt, Austria.
1780 – Founding Father Alexander Hamilton marries Elizabeth Schuyler Hamilton at the Schuyler Mansion in Albany, New York.
1812 – The French invasion of Russia comes to an end as the remnants of the Grande Armée are expelled from Russia.
1814 – War of 1812: The Royal Navy seizes control of Lake Borgne, Louisiana.
1819 – Alabama becomes the 22nd U.S. state.
1836 – The Toledo War unofficially ends as the "Frostbitten Convention" votes to accept Congress' terms for admitting Michigan as a U.S. state.
1863 – American Civil War: The Confederate victory under General James Longstreet at the Battle of Bean's Station in East Tennessee ends the Knoxville Campaign, but achieves very little as Longstreet returns to Virginia next spring.
1896 – The Glasgow Underground Railway is opened by the Glasgow District Subway Company.
1900 – Quantum mechanics: Max Planck presents a theoretical derivation of his black-body radiation law (quantum theory) at the Physic Society in Berlin.

1901–present
1902 – The Commercial Pacific Cable Company lays the first Pacific telegraph cable, from San Francisco to Honolulu.
1903 – The Wright brothers make their first attempt to fly with the Wright Flyer at Kitty Hawk, North Carolina.
1907 – The , the largest ever ship without a heat engine, runs aground and founders near the Hellweather's Reef within the Isles of Scilly in a gale. The pilot and 15 seamen die.
1909 – New South Wales Premier Charles Wade signs the Seat of Government Surrender Act 1909, formally completing the transfer of State land to the Commonwealth to create the Australian Capital Territory.
1911 – Roald Amundsen's team, comprising himself, Olav Bjaaland, Helmer Hanssen, Sverre Hassel, and Oscar Wisting, becomes the first to reach the South Pole.
1913 – , the fourth and last  ship, launches, eventually becoming one of the Japanese workhorses during World War I and World War II.
1914 – Lisandro de la Torre and others found the Democratic Progressive Party (Partido Demócrata Progresista, PDP) at the Hotel Savoy, Buenos Aires, Argentina.
1918 – Friedrich Karl von Hessen, a German prince elected by the Parliament of Finland to become King Väinö I, renounces the Finnish throne.
  1918   – Portuguese President Sidónio Pais is assassinated.
  1918   – The 1918 United Kingdom general election occurs, the first where women were permitted to vote. In Ireland the Irish republican political party Sinn Féin wins a landslide victory with nearly 47% of the popular vote.
  1918   – Giacomo Puccini's comic opera Gianni Schicchi premiered at the Metropolitan Opera in New York City.
1939 – Winter War: The Soviet Union is expelled from the League of Nations for invading Finland.
1940 – Plutonium (specifically Pu-238) is first isolated at Berkeley, California.
1948 – Thomas T. Goldsmith Jr. and Estle Ray Mann are granted a patent for their cathode-ray tube amusement device, the earliest known interactive electronic game.
1955 – Albania, Austria, Bulgaria, Cambodia, Ceylon, Finland, Hungary, Ireland, Italy, Jordan, Laos, Libya, Nepal, Portugal, Romania and Spain join the United Nations through United Nations Security Council Resolution 109.
1958 – The 3rd Soviet Antarctic Expedition becomes the first to reach the southern pole of inaccessibility.
1960 – Convention against Discrimination in Education of UNESCO is adopted.
1962 – NASA's Mariner 2 becomes the first spacecraft to fly by Venus.
1963 – The dam containing the Baldwin Hills Reservoir bursts, killing five people and damaging hundreds of homes in Los Angeles, California.
1964 – American Civil Rights Movement: Heart of Atlanta Motel v. United States: The Supreme Court of the United States rules that Congress can use the Constitution's Commerce Clause to fight discrimination.
1971 – Bangladesh Liberation War: Over 200 of East Pakistans intellectuals are executed by the Pakistan Army and their local allies. (The date is commemorated in Bangladesh as Martyred Intellectuals Day.)
1972 – Apollo program: Eugene Cernan is the most recent person to walk on the moon, after he and Harrison Schmitt complete the third and final extravehicular activity (EVA) of the Apollo 17 mission.
1981 – Arab–Israeli conflict: Israel's Knesset ratifies the Golan Heights Law, extending Israeli law to the Golan Heights.
1985 – Wilma Mankiller takes office as the first woman elected to serve as Principal Chief of the Cherokee Nation.
1986 – Qasba Aligarh massacre: Over 400 Muhajirs killed in revenge killings in Qasba colony after a raid on Pashtun heroin processing and distribution center in Sohrab Goth by the security forces.
1992 – War in Abkhazia: Siege of Tkvarcheli: A helicopter carrying evacuees from Tkvarcheli is shot down, resulting in at least 52 deaths, including 25 children. The incident catalyses more concerted Russian military intervention on behalf of Abkhazia.
1994 – Construction begins on the Three Gorges Dam on the Yangtze river.
1995 – Yugoslav Wars: The Dayton Agreement is signed in Paris by the leaders of the Federal Republic of Yugoslavia, Croatia, and Bosnia and Herzegovina.
1998 – Yugoslav Wars: The Yugoslav Army ambushes a group of Kosovo Liberation Army fighters attempting to smuggle weapons from Albania into Kosovo, killing 36.
1999 – Torrential rains cause flash floods in Vargas, Venezuela, resulting in tens of thousands of deaths, the destruction of thousands of homes, and the complete collapse of the state's infrastructure.
2003 – Pakistani President Pervez Musharraf narrowly escapes an assassination attempt.
2004 – The Millau Viaduct, the tallest bridge in the world, is formally inaugurated near Millau, France.
2012 – Sandy Hook Elementary School shooting: Twenty-eight people, including the gunman, are killed in Sandy Hook, Connecticut.
2013 – A reported coup attempt in South Sudan leads to continued fighting and hundreds of casualties.
2017 – The Walt Disney Company announces that it would acquire 21st Century Fox, including the 20th Century Fox movie studio, for $52.4 billion.
2020 – A total solar eclipse is visible from parts of the South Pacific Ocean, southern South America, and the South Atlantic Ocean.

Births

Pre-1600
1009 – Go-Suzaku, emperor of Japan (d. 1045)
1332 – Frederick III, German nobleman (d. 1381)
1546 – Tycho Brahe, Danish astronomer and chemist (d. 1601)
1599 – Charles Berkeley, 2nd Viscount Fitzhardinge, English politician (d. 1668)

1601–1900
1607 – János Kemény, Hungarian prince (d. 1662)
1625 – Barthélemy d'Herbelot, French orientalist and academic (d. 1695)
1631 – Anne Conway, English philosopher and author (d. 1679)
1640 – Aphra Behn, English playwright and author (d. 1689)
1678 – Daniel Neal, English historian and author (d. 1743)
1720 – Justus Möser, German jurist and theorist (d. 1794)
1730 – Capel Bond, English organist and composer (d. 1790)
1738 – Jan Antonín Koželuh, Czech composer and educator (d. 1814)
1775 – Philander Chase, American bishop and educator, founded Kenyon College (d. 1852)
  1775   – Thomas Cochrane, 10th Earl of Dundonald, Scottish admiral and politician (d. 1860)
1777 – Du Pre Alexander, 2nd Earl of Caledon, Irish politician, Lord Lieutenant of Tyrone (d. 1839)
1784 – Princess Maria Antonia of Naples and Sicily (d. 1806)
1789 – Maria Szymanowska, Polish composer and pianist (d. 1831)
1791 – Charles Wolfe, Irish priest and poet (d. 1823)
1794 – Erastus Corning, American businessman and politician (d. 1872)
1816 – Abraham Hochmuth, Hungarian rabbi and educator (d. 1889)
1824 – Pierre Puvis de Chavannes, French painter and illustrator (d. 1898)
1832 – Daniel H. Reynolds, American general, lawyer, and politician (d. 1902)
1851 – Mary Tappan Wright, American novelist and short story writer (d. 1916)
1852 – Daniel De Leon, Curaçaoan-American journalist and politician (d. 1914)
1856 – Louis Marshall, American lawyer and activist (d. 1929)
1866 – Roger Fry, English painter and critic (d. 1934)
1870 – Karl Renner, Austrian lawyer and politician, 4th President of Austria (d. 1950)
1881 – Katherine MacDonald, American actress and producer (d. 1956)
1883 – Manolis Kalomiris, Greek pianist and composer (d. 1962)
  1883   – Morihei Ueshiba, Japanese martial artist, developed aikido (d. 1969)
1884 – Jane Cowl, American actress and playwright (d. 1950)
1887 – Xul Solar, Argentinian painter and sculptor (d. 1963)
1894 – Alexander Nelke, Estonian-American painter and carpenter (d. 1974)
1895 – George VI of the United Kingdom (d. 1952)
  1895   – Paul Éluard, French poet and author (d. 1952)
1896 – Jimmy Doolittle, American general and pilot, Medal of Honor recipient (d. 1993)
1897 – Kurt Schuschnigg, Italian-Austrian lawyer and politician, 15th Federal Chancellor of Austria (d. 1977)
  1897   – Margaret Chase Smith, American educator and politician (d. 1995)
  1899   – DeFord Bailey, American Hall of Fame country and blues musician (d. 1982)

1901–present
1901 – Henri Cochet, French tennis player (d. 1987)
  1901   – Paul of Greece (d. 1964)
1902 – Frances Bavier, American actress (d. 1989)
  1902   – Herbert Feigl, Austrian philosopher from the Vienna Circle (d. 1988)
1903 – Walter Rangeley, English sprinter (d. 1982)
1904 – Virginia Coffey, American civil rights activist (d. 2003)
1908 – Morey Amsterdam, American actor, singer, and screenwriter (d. 1996)
  1908   – Claude Davey, Welsh rugby player (d. 2001)
  1908   – Mária Szepes, Hungarian journalist, author, and screenwriter (d. 2007)
1909 – Edward Lawrie Tatum, American geneticist and academic, Nobel Prize laureate (d. 1975)
1911 – Spike Jones, American singer and bandleader (d. 1965)
  1911   – Hans von Ohain, German-American physicist and engineer (d. 1998)
  1911   – Jerzy Iwanow-Szajnowicz, Greek-Polish swimmer and water polo player (d. 1943)
1914 – Karl Carstens, German lieutenant and politician, 5th President of the Federal Republic of Germany (d. 1992)
  1914   – Rosalyn Tureck, American pianist and harpsichord player (d. 2003)
1915 – Dan Dailey, American dancer and actor (d. 1978)
1916 – Shirley Jackson, American novelist and short story writer (d. 1965)
1917 – C.-H. Hermansson, Swedish author and politician (d. 2016)
  1917   – Elyse Knox, American actress and fashion designer (d. 2012)
  1917   – June Taylor, American dancer and choreographer (d. 2004)
1918 – James T. Aubrey, American broadcaster (d. 1994)
  1918   – Radu Beligan, Romanian actor and director (d. 2016)
  1918   – B. K. S. Iyengar, Indian yoga instructor and author, founded Iyengar Yoga (d. 2014)
1920 – Clark Terry, American trumpet player, composer, and educator (d. 2015)
1922 – Nikolay Basov, Russian physicist and academic, Nobel Prize laureate (d. 2001)
  1922   – Don Hewitt, American journalist and producer, created 60 Minutes (d. 2009)
  1922   – Junior J. Spurrier, American sergeant, Medal of Honor recipient (d. 1984)
1923 – Gerard Reve, Dutch-Belgian author and poet (d. 2006)
1924 – Raj Kapoor, Indian actor, director, and producer (d. 1988)
1925 – Sam Jones, American baseball player (d. 1971)
1927 – Richard Cassilly, American tenor and actor (d. 1998)
  1927   – Koos Rietkerk, Dutch lawyer and politician, Dutch Minister of the Interior (d. 1986)
1929 – Ron Jarden, New Zealand rugby player (d. 1977)
1930 – David R. Harris, English geographer, anthropologist, and archaeologist (d. 2013)
  1930   – Margaret Bakkes, South African author (d. 2016)
1931 – Jon Elia, Pakistani philosopher, poet, and scholar (d. 2002)
  1931   – Vladimir-Georg Karassev-Orgusaar, Estonian director and politician (d. 2015)
1932 – George Furth, American actor and playwright (d. 2008)
  1932   – Abbe Lane, American actress, singer, and dancer
  1932   – Charlie Rich, American singer-songwriter and guitarist (d. 1995)
1934 – Shyam Benegal, Indian director and screenwriter
  1934   – Charlie Hodge, American guitarist and singer (d. 2006)
1935 – Lewis Arquette, American actor, producer, and screenwriter (d. 2001)
  1935   – Lee Remick, American actress (d. 1991)
1938 – Leonardo Boff, Brazilian theologian and author
  1938   – Charlie Griffith, Barbadian cricketer
1939 – Ann Cryer, English academic and politician
  1939   – Ernie Davis, American football player (d. 1963)
1940 – Lex Gold, Scottish footballer and civil servant
1941 – Karan Armstrong, American soprano and actress (d. 2021)
  1941   – Ellen Willis, American journalist, critic, and academic (d. 2006)
1942 – Chris Harris, English actor and director (d. 2014)
  1942   – Dick Wagner, American singer-songwriter and guitarist (d. 2014)
1943 – Tommy McAvoy, Scottish politician
  1943   – Emmett Tyrrell, American journalist, author, and publisher, founded The American Spectator
1944 – Graham Kirkham, Baron Kirkham, English businessman, founded DFS
  1944   – Denis Thwaites, English professional footballer murdered in the 2015 Sousse attacks (d. 2015)
1946 – Antony Beevor, English historian and author
  1946   – Jane Birkin, English-French actress and singer
  1946   – John Du Prez, English conductor and composer
  1946   – Patty Duke, American actress (d. 2016)
  1946   – Ruth Fuchs, German javelin thrower and politician
  1946   – Peter Lorimer, Scottish footballer (d. 2021)
  1946   – Michael Ovitz, American talent agent, co-founded Creative Artists Agency
  1946   – Stan Smith, American tennis player and coach
  1946   – Joyce Vincent Wilson, American singer 
1947 – Christopher Parkening, American guitarist and educator
  1947   – Dilma Rousseff, Brazilian economist and politician, 36th President of Brazil
1948 – Lester Bangs, American journalist and author (d. 1982)
  1948   – Kim Beazley, Australian politician and diplomat, 9th Deputy Prime Minister of Australia
  1948   – Boudewijn Büch, Dutch author, poet, and television host (d. 2002)
  1948   – Peeter Kreitzberg, Estonian lawyer and politician (d. 2011)
1949 – Bill Buckner, American baseball player and manager (d. 2019)
  1949   – Cliff Williams, Australian bass player 
1951 – Jan Timman, Dutch chess player and author
1952 – John Lurie, American actor, saxophonist, painter, director, and producer 
1953 – Vijay Amritraj, Indian tennis player and sportscaster
  1953   – Wade Davis, Canadian anthropologist, author, and photographer
  1953   – René Eespere, Estonian composer
  1953   – Vangelis Meimarakis, Greek lawyer and politician, 4th Greek Minister for National Defence
  1953   – Mikael Odenberg, Swedish soldier and politician, 29th Swedish Minister for Defence
1954 – Alan Kulwicki, American race car driver (d. 1993)
  1954   – Steve MacLean, Canadian physicist and astronaut
1955 – Jane Crafter, Australian golfer
  1955   – Jill Pipher, American mathematician and academic
1956 – Linda Fabiani, Scottish politician
  1956   – Hanni Wenzel, German skier
1958 – Mike Scott, Scottish singer-songwriter and guitarist 
  1958   – Spider Stacy, English singer-songwriter and guitarist 
1959 – Bob Paris, American-Canadian bodybuilder and actor
  1959   – Jorge Vaca, Mexican boxer
1960 – James Comey, American lawyer, 7th Director of the Federal Bureau of Investigation
  1960   – Don Franklin, American actor
  1960   – Chris Waddle, English footballer, manager, and sportscaster
  1960   – Diane Williams, American sprinter
1961 – Jeff Robinson, American baseball player (d. 2014)
  1961   – Patrik Sundström, Swedish ice hockey player
1963 – Greg Abbott, English footballer and manager
  1963   – Diana Gansky, German discus thrower
1965 – Craig Biggio, American baseball player and coach
  1965   – Ken Hill, American baseball player
  1965   – Ted Raimi, American actor, director, and screenwriter
1966 – Fabrizio Giovanardi, Italian race car driver
  1966   – Anthony Mason, American basketball player (d. 2015)
  1966   – Helle Thorning-Schmidt, Danish academic and politician, 41st Prime Minister of Denmark
  1966   – Bill Ranford, Canadian ice hockey player and coach
  1966   – Tim Sköld, Swedish bass player and producer 
1967 – Ewa Białołęcka, Polish author
  1967   – Hanne Haugland, Norwegian high jumper and coach
1968 – Kelley Armstrong, Canadian author
1969 – Scott Hatteberg, American baseball player and sportscaster
  1969   – Archie Kao, American actor and producer
  1969   – Arthur Numan, Dutch footballer and manager
  1969   – Natascha McElhone, English-Irish actress
1970 – Anna Maria Jopek, Polish singer-songwriter, pianist, and producer
  1970   – Beth Orton, English singer-songwriter and guitarist
1971 – Michaela Watkins, American actor and comedian
1972 – Miranda Hart, English actress
  1972   – Marcus Jensen, American baseball player and coach
1973 – Falk Balzer, German hurdler
  1973   – Pat Burke, Irish basketball player
  1973   – Tomasz Radzinski, Polish-Canadian footballer
  1973   – Saulius Štombergas, Lithuanian basketball player and coach
1974 – Billy Koch, American baseball player
1975 – Justin Furstenfeld, American singer-songwriter, guitarist, and producer
  1975   – Ben Kay, English rugby player 
1976 – Tammy Blanchard, American actress and singer
  1976   – Leland Chapman, American bounty hunter
  1976   – Sebastien Chaule, French-German rugby player
  1976   – André Couto, Portuguese race car driver
  1976   – Santiago Ezquerro, Spanish footballer
1977 – Brendan Nash, Australian-Jamaican cricketer
  1977   – Jamie Peacock, English rugby player and manager
1978 – Dean Brogan, Australian footballer and coach
  1978   – Shedrack Kibet Korir, Kenyan runner
  1978   – Zdeněk Pospěch, Czech footballer
  1978   – Patty Schnyder, Swiss tennis player
  1978   – Kim St-Pierre, Canadian ice hockey player
1979 – Jean-Alain Boumsong, French footballer
  1979   – Andrei Makrov, Estonian ice hockey player
  1979   – Sophie Monk, English-Australian singer-songwriter and actress 
  1979   – Michael Owen, English footballer and sportscaster
  1979   – Rocc, Slovenian opera stage director and designer
1980 – Gordon Greer, Scottish footballer
  1980   – Didier Zokora, Ivorian footballer
  1980   – Thed Björk, Swedish race car driver
  1981 – Amber Chia, Malaysian model
  1981   – Johnny Jeter, American wrestler
  1981   – Liam Lawrence, Irish footballer
  1981   – Shaun Marcum, American baseball player
1982 – Josh Fields, American baseball player
  1982   – Steve Sidwell, English footballer
  1982   – Anthony Way, English singer and actor
1983 – Leanne Mitchell, English singer-songwriter
1984 – Chris Brunt, Northern Irish footballer 
  1984   – Rana Daggubati, Indian actor and producer
  1984   – Ed Rainsford, Zimbabwean cricketer
1985 – Jakub Błaszczykowski, Polish footballer
  1985   – Alex Pennie, Welsh keyboard player 
  1985   – Paul Rabil, American lacrosse player
  1985   – Tom Smith, English-Welsh rugby player
  1985   – Nonami Takizawa, Japanese actress and singer
1987 – Kenneth Medwood, Belizean-American hurdler 
1988 – Nicolas Batum, French basketball player
  1988   – Nate Ebner, American football player 
  1988   – Vanessa Hudgens, American actress and singer 
  1988   – Hayato Sakamoto, Japanese baseball player
1989 – Sam Burgess, English rugby league player
  1989   – Pedro Roberto Silva Botelho, Brazilian footballer
  1989   – Onew, South Korean singer-songwriter and dancer
1991 – Ben Henry, New Zealand rugby league player
  1991   – Offset, American rapper
1992 – Tori Kelly, American singer-songwriter
  1992   – Ryo Miyaichi, Japanese footballer
1993 – Antonio Giovinazzi, Italian race car driver
1995 – Calvyn Justus, South African swimmer
1996 – Li Zijun, Chinese figure skater
1997 – DK Metcalf, American football player

Deaths

Pre-1600
 618 – Xue Rengao, emperor of Qin
 648 – John III of the Sedre, Syriac Orthodox Patriarch of Antioch
 704 – Aldfrith, king of Northumbria (or 705)
 872 – Pope Adrian II (b. 792)
1077 – Agnes of Poitou, Holy Roman Empress  and regent (b. c. 1025)
1293 – Al-Ashraf Khalil, Mamluk sultan of Egypt
1311 – Margaret of Brabant, German queen consort (b. 1276)
1332 – Rinchinbal Khan, Mongolian emperor (b. 1326)
1359 – Cangrande II della Scala, Lord of Verona (b. 1332)
1417 – John Oldcastle, English Lollard leader
1460 – Guarino da Verona, Italian scholar and translator (b. 1370)
1480 – Niccolò Perotti, humanist scholar (b. 1429)
1503 – Sten Sture the Elder, regent of Sweden (b. 1440)
1510 – Friedrich of Saxony (b. 1473)
1542 – James V of Scotland (b. 1512)
1591 – John of the Cross, Spanish priest and saint (b. 1542)
1595 – Henry Hastings, 3rd Earl of Huntingdon (b. 1535)

1601–1900
1624 – Charles Howard, 1st Earl of Nottingham, English politician, Lord High Admiral (b. 1536)
1651 – Pierre Dupuy, French historian and scholar (b. 1582)
1715 – Thomas Tenison, English archbishop (b. 1636)
1735 – Thomas Tanner, English bishop and historian (b. 1674)
1741 – Charles Rollin, French historian and educator (b. 1661)
1785 – Giovanni Battista Cipriani, Italian painter and engraver (b. 1727)
1788 – Carl Philipp Emanuel Bach, German pianist and composer (b. 1714)
  1788   – Charles III of Spain (b. 1716)
1799 – George Washington,  American general and politician, 1st President of the United States (b. 1732)
1831 – Martin Baum, American businessman and politician, 5th Mayor of Cincinnati (b. 1765)
1838 – Jean-Olivier Chénier, Canadian physician (b. 1806)
1842 – Ben Crack-O, king of several tribes around Cape Palmas
1860 – George Hamilton-Gordon, 4th Earl of Aberdeen, Scottish-English politician, Prime Minister of the United Kingdom (b. 1784)
1861 – Albert, Prince Consort of the United Kingdom (b. 1819)
1865 – Johan Georg Forchhammer, Danish geologist and mineralogist (b. 1794)
1873 – Louis Agassiz, Swiss-American zoologist and geologist (b. 1807)
1878 – Princess Alice of the United Kingdom (b. 1843)

1901–present
1912 – Belgrave Edward Sutton Ninnis, English lieutenant and explorer (b. 1887)
1917 – Phil Waller, Welsh rugby player (b. 1889)
1920 – George Gipp, American football player (b. 1895)
1927 – Julian Sochocki, Russian mathematician and academic (b. 1842)
1929 – Henry B. Jackson, British admiral (b. 1855)
1935 – Stanley G. Weinbaum, American author (b. 1902)
1937 – Fabián de la Rosa, Filipino painter and educator (b. 1869)
1940 – Anton Korošec, Slovenian priest and politician, 10th Prime Minister of Yugoslavia (b. 1872)
1943 – John Harvey Kellogg, American physician and businessman, co-invented corn flakes (b. 1852)
1944 – Lupe Vélez, Mexican actress (b. 1908)
1947 – Stanley Baldwin, English lieutenant and politician, Prime Minister of the United Kingdom (b. 1867)
  1947   – Edward Higgins, English-American 3rd General of The Salvation Army (b. 1864)
1953 – Marjorie Kinnan Rawlings, American author and academic (b. 1896)
1956 – Juho Kusti Paasikivi, Finnish lawyer and politician, 7th President of Finland (b. 1870)
1963 – Dinah Washington, American singer and pianist (b. 1924)
1964 – William Bendix, American actor (b. 1906)
1970 – Franz Schlegelberger, German judge and politician, German Reich Minister of Justice (b. 1876)
1971 – Mufazzal Haider Chaudhury, Bangladeshi linguist and scholar (b. 1926)
  1971   – Munier Choudhury, Bangladeshi author, playwright, and critic (b. 1925)
  1971   – Shahidullah Kaiser, Bangladeshi journalist and author (b. 1927)
1974 – Walter Lippmann, American journalist and author (b. 1889)
1975 – Arthur Treacher, English-American entertainer (b. 1894)
1978 – Salvador de Madariaga, Spanish historian and diplomat, co-founded the College of Europe (b. 1886)
1980 – Elston Howard, American baseball player and coach (b. 1929)
1984 – Vicente Aleixandre, Spanish poet and academic, Nobel Prize laureate (b. 1898)
1985 – Catherine Doherty, Russian-Canadian activist, founded the Madonna House Apostolate (b. 1896)
  1985   – Roger Maris, American baseball player and coach (b. 1934)
1989 – Jock Mahoney, American actor and stuntman (b. 1919)
  1989   – Andrei Sakharov, Russian physicist and activist, Nobel Prize laureate (b. 1921)
1990 – Friedrich Dürrenmatt, Swiss author and playwright (b. 1921)
  1990   – Paula Nenette Pepin, French composer, pianist and lyricist (b. 1908)
1991 – Robert Eddison, Japanese-English actor  (b. 1908)
1993 – Jeff Alm, American football player (b. 1968)
  1993   – Myrna Loy, American actress (b. 1905)
1994 – Orval Faubus, American soldier and politician, 36th Governor of Arkansas (b. 1910)
1995 – G. C. Edmondson, American soldier and author (b. 1922)
1996 – Gaston Miron, Canadian poet and author (b. 1928)
1997 – Stubby Kaye, American actor and comedian (b. 1918)
  1997   – Emily Cheney Neville, American author (b. 1919)
  1997   – Kurt Winter, Canadian guitarist and songwriter (b. 1946)
1998 – Norman Fell, American actor and comedian (b. 1924)
  1998   – A. Leon Higginbotham Jr., American lawyer, judge, and activist (b. 1928)
  1998   – Annette Strauss, American philanthropist and politician, Mayor of Dallas (b. 1924)
2001 – W. G. Sebald, German novelist, essayist, and poet  (b. 1944)
2003 – Jeanne Crain, American actress (b. 1925)
  2003   – Blas Ople, Filipino journalist and politician, 21st President of the Senate of the Philippines (b. 1927)
  2003   – Frank Sheeran, American union leader and mobster (b. 1920)
2004 – Rod Kanehl, American baseball player (b. 1934)
  2004   – Fernando Poe Jr., Filipino actor, director, producer, and politician (b. 1939)
2006 – Anton Balasingham, Sri Lankan-English strategist and negotiator (b. 1938)
  2006   – Ahmet Ertegun, Turkish-American composer and producer, co-founded Atlantic Records (b. 1923)
  2006   – Mike Evans, American actor and screenwriter (b. 1949)
2009 – Alan A'Court, English footballer and manager (b. 1934)
2010 – Timothy Davlin, American politician, Mayor of Springfield (b. 1957)
  2010   – Neva Patterson, American actress (b. 1920)
  2010   – Dale Roberts, English footballer (b. 1986)
2011 – Joe Simon, American author and illustrator (b. 1913)
  2011   – Billie Jo Spears, American singer-songwriter (b. 1937)
2012 – John Graham, English general (b. 1923)
  2012   – Edward Jones, American police officer and politician (b. 1950)
  2012   – Victoria Leigh Soto, American educator (b. 1985)
2013 – Janet Dailey, American author (b. 1944)
  2013   – C. N. Karunakaran, Indian painter and illustrator (b. 1940)
  2013   – Dennis Lindley, English statistician and academic (b. 1923)
  2013   – Peter O'Toole, British-Irish actor (b. 1932)
  2013   – George Rodrigue, American painter (b. 1944)
2014 – Theo Colborn, American zoologist and academic (b. 1927) 
  2014   – Irene Dalis, American soprano and pianist (b. 1925)
  2014   – Louis Alphonse Koyagialo, Congolese politician, Prime Minister of the Democratic Republic of the Congo (b. 1947)
  2014   – Bess Myerson, American model, activist, game show panelist and television personality; Miss America 1945 (b. 1924)
  2014   – Fred Thurston, American football player (b. 1933)
2015 – Terry Backer, American soldier and politician (b. 1954)
  2015   – Glen Sonmor, Canadian ice hockey player and coach (b. 1929)
  2015   – Vadym Tyshchenko, Ukrainian footballer and manager (b. 1963)
  2015   – Lillian Vernon, German-American businesswoman and philanthropist, founded the Lillian Vernon Company (b. 1927)
2016 – Paulo Evaristo Arns, Brazilian cardinal (b. 1921)
  2016   – Bernard Fox, Welsh actor (b. 1927)
2017 – Yu Kwang-chung, Chinese writer (b. 1928)
2019 – Chuy Bravo, Mexican-American comedian and actor (b. 1956)
2020 – Gérard Houllier, French Football manager (b. 1947)

Holidays and observances
 Christian feast day:
 Folcwin
 John of the Cross
 John III of the Sedre (Syriac Orthodox Church)
 Matronian
 Nicasius of Rheims
 Nimatullah Kassab (Maronite Church)
 Spyridon (Western Church)
 Venantius Fortunatus
 December 14 (Eastern Orthodox liturgics)
 Alabama Day (Alabama)
 Forty-seven Ronin Remembrance Day (Sengaku-ji, Tokyo)
 Martyred Intellectuals Day (Bangladesh)
 Monkey Day

References

External links

 BBC: On This Day
 
 Historical Events on December 14

Days of the year
December